HMS Dasher is an  P2000 patrol and training vessel of the British Royal Navy. Dasher was built at Vosper Thorneycroft and commissioned in 1988.

Operational history
Prior to 2004, Dasher was based at Devonport as the training vessel for University Royal Naval Unit Bristol (URNUB).

The Royal Navy Cyprus Squadron was created in February 2003, to protect ships around the Sovereign Base Areas in Cyprus, a vital staging post in the British logistic chain to Iraq. Both were fitted with Kevlar armour and three FN MAG general purpose machine guns, with an extra crew member (compared to the P2000s assigned to URNU duties) employed as a gunners yeoman.

The Cyprus Squadron was disbanded in 2010 and Dasher was assigned to the Faslane Patrol Boat Squadron, protecting the ballistic missile submarines at HMNB Clyde. In September 2012, she swapped places with the more modern  and returned to Devonport as the training vessel of Bristol URNU.

From 2020 to 2022, she was posted to Gibraltar Squadron.

Notes

References

External links

 

Archer-class patrol vessels